The seal of Mauritania is the national emblem based on the national flag of Mauritania, which was adopted on 15 August 2017. It contains red, green, and gold emblems. The green symbolizes Islam, the major religion in the nation, the gold represents the sands of the Sahara desert, and the red represents the bloodshed of the people that fought for independence. The crescent and star are also emblems of Islam. The edges read "Islamic Republic of Mauritania" in Arabic and French.

See also
 Flag of Mauritania
 National anthem of Mauritania

Mauritania
National symbols of Mauritania
Mauritania
Mauritania
1959 introductions
1959 in Mauritania